Rear-Admiral Guy Waterhouse Hallifax  (21 June 188428 March 1941) was a South African military commander, who was recruited by the South African government to organise a navy.

Naval career 
Hallifax joined HMS Britannia in 1899 and served as a Naval Advisor in Turkey, for which he was awarded the Order of the Medjideh (3rd class).
During the First World War served as first lieutenant and torpedo lieutenant on board . After being attached to the Inter-Allied Commission in Berlin he served in HMS Valiant, Home Fleet, from 1921 to 1923. He then attended various disarmarmament meetings at Geneva and was promoted captain in 1924. Two years later he commanded the cruiser , of the China Squadron, remaining there until 1928. He was later appointed naval attaché in Paris and also served in that capacity in Madrid, Brussels and The Hague. In 1935 he became Director of the Signal Division of the Admiralty, and was promoted Rear-Admiral, retired, in the same year.

Rear-Admiral Hallifax went out to South Africa as secretary to Lord Clarendon, who was then Governor-General in South Africa, in 1936, and continued in this capacity for the first four months of the governor-generalship of Sir Patrick Duncan.
On the outbreak of World War II in 1939, he was recruited by the South African government to organise a navy, which was named the Seaward Defence Force.

South African Navy
As Director of the Seaward Defence Force, he established a small fleet of minesweepers and anti-submarine vessels for coastal defence, and organised naval detachments in the major ports.

Promotions
 Confirmed in the rank of Sub-Lieutenant 15 July 1903.
 Sub-Lieutenant to Lieutenant 15 January 1905.
 Commander to Captain 30 June 1924.
 Captain to Rear-Admiral 3 October 1935.
 Placed on the Retired List 4 October 1935.

Death

References

External links

See also
List of South African military chiefs
South African Navy

1884 births
1941 deaths
South African admirals
Companions of the Order of St Michael and St George
People educated at Stubbington House School
Royal Navy rear admirals
Royal Navy officers of World War I
South African military personnel killed in World War II
Victims of aviation accidents or incidents in South Africa